Gloucester Cathedral, formally the Cathedral Church of St Peter and the Holy and Indivisible Trinity, in Gloucester, England, stands in the north of the city near the River Severn. It originated with the establishment of a minster, Gloucester Abbey, dedicated to Saint Peter and founded by Osric, King of the Hwicce, in around 679. The subsequent history of the church is complex; Osric's foundation came under the control of the Benedictine Order at the beginning of the 11th century and in around 1058, Ealdred, Bishop of Worcester, established a new abbey "a little further from the place where it had stood". The abbey appears not to have been an initial success, by 1072, the number of attendant monks had reduced to two. The present building was begun by Abbott Serlo in about 1089, following a major fire the previous year.

Serlo's efforts transformed the abbey's fortunes; rising revenues and royal patronage enabled the construction of a major church. William the Conqueror held his Christmas Court at the chapter house in 1085, at which he ordered the compilation of Domesday Book. In October 1216, Henry III was crowned at the abbey. Following another disastrous fire in 1222, an ambitious rebuilding programme was begun. In the 14th century, the Great and Little Cloisters were constructed, displaying the earliest, and perhaps the finest, examples of fan vaulting anywhere. The cathedral contains the shrine of Edward II, who was murdered at Berkeley Castle nearby.

Following the Dissolution of the monasteries by Henry VIII in 1536, the abbey was refounded as a cathedral. The cathedral underwent much restoration in the 18th century, and again in the 19th. In 1989, it celebrated its 900th anniversary. In 2015, the installation of Rachel Treweek saw the Church of England appoint its first woman as a diocesan bishop. The cathedral has frequently been used as a filming location, including as a stand-in for Hogwarts in the Harry Potter movies.

The cathedral is a Grade I listed building. There are a large number of other listed buildings within the cathedral complex, many also listed at Grade I, the highest grade. These include the Treasury, the Chapter House, the Cloisters, the precinct wall and a number of the medieval gates into the cathedral enclosure. Others are listed at Grade II* and Grade II.

History

Early history
The first recorded religious building on the site was a minster founded by Osric of Hwicce in around 679.  A relative, Kyneburg, was consecrated as the first abbess by Bosel, Bishop of Worcester. Monastic life flourished, and the possessions of the house increased, but after 767 it seems probable that the nuns dispersed during the confusion of civil strife in England. Beornwulf of Mercia is said to have rebuilt the church, and to have endowed a body of secular priests with the former possessions of the nuns. In 1022 Wulfstan, Bishop of Worcester, had the Benedictine rule introduced and the abbey dedicated to St Peter. The early building history is confused; at some point in the early 1tth century the monastic buildings were destroyed by fire, and it is recorded that Ealdred, Bishop of Worcester rebuilt the church in around 1058 on a site "a little further from the place where it stood, and nearer to the side of the city". The foundations of the present church were laid by Abbot Serlo (1072–1104). Appointed by William the Conqueror in 1072, Serlo found a new building with a complement of only two monks and eight novices. The situation was worsened by another major fire in 1088. But the town retained its importance as a favoured royal seat; William celebrated Christmas there in 1085 when, in discussion with his Witan in the chapter house, he initiated the assembly of Domesday Book. His support, together with that of others such as Walter de Lacy and his wife, enabled Serlo to embark on a major rebuilding, and between the laying of the foundation stone in 1089 and the abbey's re-consecration in 1100, work on the nave, the apse, the crypt and the chapter house was undertaken at speed and on an "exceptional scale".

St Peter's Abbey had long enjoyed important royal connections, from its foundation, then under the patronage of the Conqueror, and in October 1216 it was chosen as the venue for the coronation of Henry III, after the death of his father, King John. The nine-year old boy was crowned in the presence of his mother Isabella, whose bracelet was reputedly used in place of a crown. The abbey's royal connections continued, albeit in a darker vein, in the following century. In 1327, Edward II was buried in an elaborate shrine at Gloucester, following his death at Berkeley Castle nearby. Widely believed to have been murdered, Edward was entombed at Gloucester in a lavish ceremony attended by his widow, Isabella and their young son, Edward. The abbey reputedly benefitted from substantial gifts donated by those making pilgrimage to Edward's shrine, although this is disputed. Nikolaus Pevsner suggests that the more likely source of revenue was the new king, making donations in piam memoriam. Others support the traditional claim, and Jon Cannon, in his work, Cathedral: The great English cathedrals and the world that made them, is certain that the presence of the body of the dead king had a long-term, beneficial, impact on the abbey's fortunes, citing Henry VIII's later decision to make it a cathedral, on account of the presence of "many famous monuments of our renowned ancestors, kings of England." 

However occasioned, the cathedral's improved financial position enabled another great period of building. This work included the cloisters, with their famed fan vaulting. St Peter's was unusual as a religious foundation in commissioning its own history, the Historia Monasterii Sancti Petri Gloucestriae. Its author, Walter Frocester (died 1412), became its first mitred abbot in 1381.

Dependencies
 In 1134, William Fitznorman gave the church of St David, Kilpeck, and the Chapel of St Mary at Kilpeck Castle to Gloucester Abbey, and a priory cell was established about 400 yards south east of the church, to house some monks displaced from Llanthony Priory by attacks of the Welsh. Kilpeck Priory closed in 1422. 
 The Priory of Saints Peter, Paul and Guthlac in Hereford was a dependency of Gloucester Abbey.
 Ewenny Priory was founded by Maurice de Londres in 1141. Maurice granted the Norman church of St. Michael to the abbey of St. Peter at Gloucester, together with the church of St Brides Major and the chapel at Ogmore "in order that a convent of monks might be formed".
 In 1146 the college of Augustinian canons at Stanley St. Leonard was given to the monastery by Roger de Berkeley III, with the consent of the prior and canons, and became St. Leonard Priory. His grandfather, Roger de Berkeley I, had retired as a monk to St Peter's Abbey around 1091.

Dissolution and recreation
At its inception, the abbey stood in the see of Worcester; but its position was transformed at the Dissolution of the monasteries. Following abolition, Henry VIII created the new Diocese of Gloucester and on 3 September 1541, the abbey church became its cathedral, with John Wakeman, last abbot of Tewkesbury, as its first bishop. The diocese covered the greater part of Gloucestershire, with small parts of Herefordshire and Wiltshire. Although staunchly Royalist in its sympathies, the city, and the cathedral, escaped largely unscathed from the tumult of the English Civil War and plans for complete demolition formulated during the Commonwealth were not taken forward.

The 18th and 19th centuries saw repeated periods of reconstruction, renovation and rebuilding. Counter to the approach sometimes adopted elsewhere in the Victorian era, the 19th restorations at Gloucester, firstly by the local architects, Frederick S. Waller and Thomas Fulljames, and latterly by George Gilbert Scott, were "on the whole, very tactful" [see box]. During the Second World War a recess in the crypt was used to house the Coronation Chair, which had been moved in August 1939 from Westminster Abbey for safe keeping. The 13th century bog-oak effigy of Robert Curthose was placed on the chair and the whole covered by sandbags. The Great East Window was also dismantled and placed in storage. The remainder of the 10,000 sandbags supplied by the Office of Works were used to protect the other monuments in the cathedral, including the tomb of Edward II.

Modern period
The cathedral celebrated its 900th anniversary in 1989. In 2015 Rachel Treweek was installed as bishop, the first woman to be appointed to a diocesan bishopric in the history of the Church of England. In September 2016 Gloucester Cathedral joined the Church of England's 'Shrinking the footprint' campaign, intended to reduce the Church of England's carbon emissions by 80% by 2050. The cathedral commissioned a solar array on the cathedral roof which is expected to reduce the cathedral's energy costs by 25%. The installation was completed by November 2016, making the 1,000-year-old cathedral the oldest one in the UK with a solar installation.

Architecture

Main building
The cathedral consists of a Norman nave (Walter de Lacy is buried there), with additions in every style of Gothic architecture.

The crypt, nave and chapter house date from the late 11th century. The crypt is one of the four apsidal cathedral crypts in England, the others being at Worcester, Winchester and Canterbury. The nave was begun in 1089. The church was largely complete by 1100. In the early 12th century, the western towers were added; the south tower collapsed around 1165.

In 1222, a fire damaged the timber roof and several of the monastic buildings. To repair the damage and update the architectural style, an ambitious building campaign was launched, including the revaulting of the nave Early English style (completed 1243); the construction of the central tower (begun 1237); the rebuilding of the collapsed south tower (completed 1246); and the rebuilding of the refectory.

The south aisle was rebuilt in 1318–29. The most notable monument is the canopied shrine of Edward II of England who was murdered at nearby Berkeley Castle in 1327. Pilgrimages to the tomb brought a huge influx of cash enabling the rebuilding and redecorating of the south transept (1329–37), the north transept (1368–73), and the choir (1350–77). The Norman choir walls are sheathed in Perpendicular tracery. The multiplication of ribs, liernes and bosses in the choir vaulting is particularly rich. The late Decorated Great East window is partly filled with surviving medieval stained glass. When completed in 1350, it was the largest window in existence.  One window  is said to depict the earliest images of the game of golf. This dates from 1350, over 300 years earlier than the earliest image of golf from Scotland. Another image, carved on a misericord, shows people playing a ball game, which has been suggested as one of the earliest images of medieval football. Between the apsidal chapels is a cross Lady chapel, and north of the nave are the cloisters, the carrels or stalls for the monks' study and writing lying to the south. In a side-chapel is a monument in coloured bog oak of Robert Curthose, eldest son of William the Conqueror and a great benefactor of the abbey, who was interred there. Monuments of William Warburton (Bishop of Gloucester) and Edward Jenner (physician) are also worthy of note. The coronation of Henry III is commemorated in a stained-glass window in the south aisle.

Between 1873 and 1890, and in 1897, the cathedral was extensively restored by George Gilbert Scott. The cathedral has forty-six 14th-century misericords and twelve 19th-century replacements by Gilbert Scott. Both types have a wide range of subject matter: mythology, everyday occurrences, religious symbolism and folklore.

Cloisters and cathedral precincts
The cloisters at Gloucester are the earliest surviving fan vaults in England, having been designed between 1351 and 1377 by Thomas de Cantebrugge. David Verey and Alan Brooks, in the 2002 revised volume, Gloucestershire 2: The Vale and the Forest of Dean, in the Pevsner Buildings of England series, call them "the most memorable in England". The cathedral itself suggests that they form "the first and best example of fan vaulting in the world". The cloisters stand to the north of the cathedral and, along with the cathedral precincts to the north and east, contain a number of listed buildings. The Great Cloister itself is listed at Grade I, as are the Little Cloister and Little Cloister House, the remains of a reservoir in the north-west corner of the Great Cloister and a passage from the cloister to the former Infirmary, the remains of the infirmary itself, and the north Precinct Wall. 

The other major structures within the precincts are the Chapter house and the Treasury and library. They date initially from the 11th century, although they have undergone major reconstruction in subsequent centuries. Both are Grade I listed buildings. The treasury adjoins the main cathedral on its northern side, with the library above it, and the chapter house adjoins the treasury.

Other structures in the precincts now form part of King's School, Gloucester including: the remains of the Abbott's lodgings and Dulverton House, both listed at Grade II*, and the gymnasium, Dulverton House Coachhouse, Wardle House, Palace Cottage and a set of railings surrounding a playground, all of which are listed at Grade II.

College Green and Miller's Green
College Green lies to the south and west of the cathedral, forming its cathedral close. It was originally the site of a series of monastic graveyards, but was largely rebuilt in the 18th century when many of the buildings were converted to domestic use. Miller's Green forms a close to the north of the cathedral and was originally the monastic service court. Both Miller's Green and College Green contain a large number of Listed buildings. College Green is entered through St Michael's Gate, which dates from the 14th century and is listed at Grade I. No.s 1, 2, 3, and 4 are listed Grade II and stand between St Michael's Gate and King Edward's Gate, which dates from the 16th century, was subject to a major restoration in the 19th century and is listed at II*. No.s 6, 7, and 8 conclude the south-western edge of the green and are all listed at Grade II. No.9 College Green begins the western range of the close and is listed Grade II*. The western range includes No.s 10, 11, 12, Beaufort House, and 13, all of which are listed at Grade II, and concludes with No. 14, which is listed Grade II*. The close is then broken by St Mary's Gateway, a scheduled monument. The War Memorial to the Royal Gloucestershire Hussars Yeomanry, a Grade II* listed structure, stands in the centre of College Green. The northern side of College Green concludes with No. 15, Community House, which is Grade II listed, and Church House, which was originally the Abbot's Lodge and is now utilised as offices and a restaurant and is listed at Grade I. On the south-eastern edge of the Green, No.s 17, 18 and 19 are listed at Grade II, while 20 College Green is Grade II*.

Miller's Green is entered through the Inner Gateway, between Community House and No. 7, Miller's Green. The gateway dates from the 14th century and formed the gatehouse to the monastic service court. It is a Grade I listed building, while No. 7 is listed at Grade II. Other buildings on Miller's Green include the Deanery, listed at Grade II*, the Old Mill House, No. 2 Miller's Green, listed at Grade II, and No.s 3, 4A, 4B, 5 and 6, all listed at Grade II.

Dean and chapter
Dean — vacant (dean-designate: Andrew Zihni)
Canon Precentor & Director of Congregational Development — Richard Mitchell (since 10 September 2016 installation)
Canon Chancellor — Celia Thomson (since 15 March 2003 installation; previously Pastor)
City Centre Rector (Diocesan Canon) — Nikki Arthy (since 2009; Rector of St Mary de Lode, St Mary de Crypt and Hempsted)
Archdeacon of Gloucester (Diocesan Canon) — Hilary Dawson (since 27 January 2019 collation)

Music

Choir
In medieval times, daily worship was sung by boys and monks from the abbey. The cathedral's current choir was established by King Henry VIII in 1539, and at present is composed of 18 boy and 20 girl choristers, as well as 12 adult singers. The choristers attend the King's School, which was also founded by Henry VIII. The choir sings regularly during term time and at major religious festivals such as Christmas or Easter. It also takes part in concerts and has been featured in choral evensong on BBC Radio 3.

Organ
The organ was originally constructed in 1666 by Thomas Harris and has the only complete 17th-century cathedral organ case surviving in the country. The pipes displayed on the front of the case are still functional. The organ was extended and modified by nearly all of the established UK organ builders, including Henry "Father" Willis who worked on the organ in 1847 and rebuilt it in 1888–89. It was rebuilt again in 1920 by Harrison & Harrison.

In 1971 Hill, Norman and Beard performed a total redesign, under the supervision of Cathedral Organist John Sanders and consultant Ralph Downes. In 1999 Nicholson & Co overhauled the organ, when the soundboards, pipework and wind supply were renovated and the computer system was updated. In 2010 Nicholson also added a Trompette Harmonique solo reed.

The organ comprises four manuals and pedals. It is designed particularly to play from its position on the Quire screen to both East and West sides of the cathedral. The Swell is situated in the centre of the case at console level and is controlled by two swell pedals, one for each side of the case. Directly above the Swell is the Great organ which is split into East and West divisions; it comprises two separate principal choruses. The fourth manual is a West Positive, mirroring the function of the Choir organ for the West side of the cathedral.

Organists

In 1582, Robert Lichfield is recorded as the organist of Gloucester Cathedral. Notable among the organists are composers and choral conductors of the Three Choirs Festival, Herbert Brewer, Herbert Sumsion and John Sanders. Herbert Howells, who was a pupil of Brewer, composed a Magnificat and Nunc dimittis for Gloucester Cathedral

Three Choirs Festival
An annual musical festival, the Three Choirs Festival, is hosted by turns in this cathedral and those of Worcester and Hereford in rotation. The Three Choirs is the oldest annual musical festival in the world.

Clock and bells

Clock 
The cathedral's clock, bells and the chimes are referred to in a repair agreement of 1525. The present clock, installed in 1898, is by Dent and Co, who built the clock for Big Ben. There is no external dial, but there is a fine Art Nouveau clock face in the north transept, dating from 1903, designed by Henry Wilson.

Bells 
The bells were rehung and augmented in 1978 to give a ring of twelve.  The two oldest bells date from before 1420, so they are older than the present tower. The bells are rung 'full circle' by the cathedral's band of ringers for the weekly practice session In addition there is Great Peter, the largest medieval bell in Britain, weighing a fraction under three tons. Great Peter is the hour bell and can also be heard ringing before the main services.

Burials and monuments
Gloucester Cathedral has a large collection of funerary monuments from the Middle Ages to the present. Notable people buried at Gloucester Cathedral include:
Osric, king of the Hwicce
Robert Curthose, eldest son of William the Conqueror
Edward II of England, seventh Plantagenet king of England (1307–1327)
John Wakeman, last Abbot of Tewkesbury and first Bishop of Gloucester (1541–1550)
James Brooks Bishop of Gloucester (1554–1558)
Richard Cheyney, Bishop of Gloucester (1562–1579)
John Bullingham, Bishop of Gloucester (1581–1598)
Members of the Hyett family from the 17th and 18th centuries, whose remains were discovered accidentally in November 2015.
William Nicholson Bishop of Gloucester (1660–1672)
Martin Benson, Bishop of Gloucester (1734–1752)
Richard Pate, landowner and Member of Parliament (MP) for Gloucester
Thomas Machen, mercer who was mayor of Gloucester three times and one time Member of Parliament for the city
Dorothea Beale, Principal of the Cheltenham Ladies' College, educational reformer and suffragist
Ralph Bigland (1712–1784), Garter Principal King of Arms
Miles Nightingall (1768–1829), army general
Albert Mansbridge (1876–1952), pioneer of adult education in Britain
John Yates (1925–2008), Bishop of Gloucester 1975–92

Film and television location
The cathedral has been used as a filming location for movies and for TV including: the first, second and sixth Harry Potter movies; the Doctor Who episodes The Next Doctor and the Fugitive of the Judoon; 
The Hollow Crown; Wolf Hall; the Sherlock special The Abominable Bride; Mary Queen of Scots; and all three of The Cousins' War adaptationsThe White Queen, The White Princess and The Spanish Princess.

Academic use
Degree ceremonies of the University of Gloucestershire and the University of the West of England (through Hartpury College) both take place at the cathedral. The cathedral is also used during school term-time as the venue for assemblies (known as morning chapel) by The King's School, Gloucester, and for events by the Denmark Road High School, Crypt Grammar School, Sir Thomas Rich's School for boys and Ribston Hall High School.

Timeline
 678-9 A small religious community was founded in Saxon times by Osric of the Hwicce. His sister Kyneburga was the first abbess.
 1017 Secular priests expelled; the monastery given to Benedictine monks.
 1072 Serlo, the first Norman abbot, appointed to the almost defunct monastery by William I.
 1089 Foundation stone of the new abbey church laid by Robert de Losinga, Bishop of Hereford.
 1100 Consecration of St Peter's Abbey.
 1216 First coronation of Henry III.
 1327 Burial of Edward II.
 1331 Perpendicular remodelling of the quire.
 1373 Great Cloister begun by Abbot Horton; completed by Abbott Frouster (1381–1412)
 1420 West End rebuilt by Abbot Morwent.
 1450 Tower begun by Abbot Sebrok; completed by Robert Tully.
 1470 Lady Chapel rebuilt by Abbot Hanley; completed by Abbot Farley (1472–98).
 1540 Dissolution of the abbey.
 1541 Refounded as a cathedral by Henry VIII.
 1616–21 William Laud holds the office of Dean of Gloucester
 1649–60 Abolition of dean and chapter, reinstated by Charles II
 1666 Installation of Great Organ by Thomas Harris
 1735–52 Martin Benson, Bishop of Gloucester, carried out major repairs and alterations to the cathedral.
 1847–73 Beginning of extensive Victorian restoration work (Frederick S. Waller and George Gilbert Scott, architects).
 1953 Major appeal for the restoration of the cathedral; renewed
 1968 Cathedral largely re-roofed and other major work completed.
 1989 900th anniversary appeal.
 1994 Restoration of tower completed.
 2000 Celebration of the novecentennial of the consecration of St Peter's Abbey.
 2015 Installation of Rachel Treweek as the Church of England’s first female diocesan bishop.

See also 
Architecture of the medieval cathedrals of England
Gothic cathedrals and churches
List of Gothic Cathedrals in Europe
List of cathedrals in the United Kingdom
Christopher Whall works in Gloucester Cathedral

Notes

References

Sources

Further reading

 Published in America as

External links 

A history of the choristers of Gloucester Cathedral

 
681 establishments
Anglican cathedrals in England
Benedictine monasteries in England
Church of England church buildings in Gloucester
Coronation church buildings
Diocese of Gloucester
English Gothic architecture in Gloucestershire
Grade I listed churches in Gloucestershire
Grade I listed cathedrals
Grade I listed buildings in Gloucestershire
Grade II* listed buildings in Gloucestershire
Monasteries in Gloucestershire
English churches with Norman architecture
Tourist attractions in Gloucestershire
History of Gloucester
Pre-Reformation Roman Catholic cathedrals
Monasteries dissolved under the English Reformation
Anglo-Saxon monastic houses
Burial sites of the De Lacy family